The accessory cephalic vein is a variable vein that passes along the radial border of the forearm to join the cephalic vein near the elbow. In some cases the accessory cephalic springs from the cephalic above the wrist and joins it again higher up. A large oblique branch frequently connects the basilic and cephalic veins on the back of the forearm.

See also
 Cephalic vein

References

Veins of the upper limb